Thomas Ranft (born 1945, in Königsee) is a German painter. He won the Hans-Theo-Richter-Preis of the Sächsische Akademie der Künste in 2003.

References

20th-century German painters
20th-century German male artists
German male painters
21st-century German painters
21st-century German male artists
1945 births
Living people
People from Königsee